Barnas is a commune in the Ardèche department in the Auvergne-Rhône-Alpes region of southern France.

The inhabitants of the commune are known as Barnassiens or Barnassiennes.

Geography
Barnas is located some 20 km west by northwest of Aubenas and 30 km east by southeast of Pradelles. Access to the commune is by Route nationale N102 which passes through the centre of the commune and the village from Mayres in the west and continuing to Thueyts in the east. The commune is mostly forest and moderately mountainous. There is a hotel and petrol station in the commune.

The Ardèche river flows through the commune from west to east parallel to the highway. There are a number of tributaries that feed into the river in the commune. On the right bank from west to east these are:
The Ruisseau d'Abraham
The Ruisseau des Combes
The Ruisseau de l'Horesson
The Ruisseau de Bournazon
The Ruisseau de Chadenac Ou de Chateau which form the eastern border of the commune.

On the left bank the river is fed by:
The Ruisseau du Grand VaVat
The Rieu Jilieux
The Ruisseau de la Farre
The Ruisseau du Saut which forms the eastern border north of the river.

History
Barnas appears as Barnas on the 1750 Cassini Map but does not appear at all on the 1790 version. The commune Barnas was created in 1913 from part of the commune of Thueyts.

Heraldry

Administration

List of Successive Mayors

Demography
In 2017 the commune had 207 inhabitants.

Sites and Monuments
The Chapdenac Tower
A 19th century Church

See also
Communes of the Ardèche department

References

Communes of Ardèche
Ardèche communes articles needing translation from French Wikipedia